Events from the year 1772 in art.

Events
July 13 – Captain James Cook leaves Plymouth in HMS Resolution on his second voyage of exploration with landscape painter William Hodges onboard (in lieu of Johann Zoffany).
King George III of the United Kingdom appoints Benjamin West official painter to the court.

Works
John Singleton Copley – Samuel Adams (Museum of Fine Arts, Boston)
Thomas Gainsborough
The Linley Sisters
William Johnstone-Pulteney
Thomas Jones – Pencerrig
Tilly Kettle – Dancing Girls (Blacks)
Anton Raphael Mengs – The Triumph of History over Time (Allegory of the Museum Clementinum; ceiling fresco in the Camera dei Papiri, Vatican Library)
Fyodor Rokotov – Portrait of Alexandra Struyskaya
Alexander Roslin
King Christian VII of Denmark
King Gustav III of Sweden
George Stubbs
The Kongouro from New Holland
Portrait of a Large Dog
Claude Joseph Vernet – The Shipwreck
Joseph Wright of Derby – Miravan Breaking Open the Tomb of his Ancestors
Johann Zoffany
The Academicians of the Royal Academy
Queen Charlotte with her children and brothers

Awards
John Flaxman is unsuccessful in the competition for the gold medal of the Royal Academy.

Births
February 8 – Louis-Marie Autissier,  French-born Belgian portrait miniature painter (died 1830)
February 26 – Gerhard von Kügelgen, German painter of portraits and history paintings (died 1820)
May 11 – Adélaïde Victoire Hall, French painter (died 1844)
August 11 – Eduard Joseph d'Alton, German engraver and naturalist (died 1840)
September 19 – Vicente López y Portaña, Spanish portrait painter (died 1850)
date unknown
Edward Bird, painter  (died 1819)
Alexander Day, English miniature painter and art dealer (died 1841)
François Louis Thomas Francia, landscape painter (died 1839)
William Hamlin, American engraver and the first engraver for the state of Rhode Island (died 1869)
Joaquín Bernardo Rubert, Spanish still life floral painter (died 1817)
Wendela Gustafva Sparre, Swedish textile artist and member of the Royal Swedish Academy of Art (died 1855)
Pavel Đurković, Serbian painter and muralist (died 1830).

Deaths
June 1 – Marcellus Laroon the Younger, English painter and draughtsman (born 1679)
June 4 – Johann Michael Feuchtmayer, stucco sculptor and plasterer (born 1709)
August 31 – Marie-Suzanne Giroust, French painter (born 1734)
October 12 – Samuel Scott, English marine and topographical painter and etcher (born 1702)
October 20 – William Taverner, English judge and landscape painter (born 1703)
November 11 – Jan Maurits Quinkhard, Dutch painter and print designer (born 1688)
November 19 – Charles Norbert Roettiers, French engraver (born 1720)
date unknown
Benoît Audran the Younger, French engraver (born 1698)
Giovanni Angelo Borroni, Italian painter of the late-Baroque and early-Neoclassic periods (born 1684)
Robert Gillow, furniture designer (born 1704)
José Romeo, Spanish painter (born 1701)
Huang Shen, Chinese painter  (born 1687)
Johanne Seizberg, German-Danish illustrator and teacher (born 1732)
Alejandro González Velázquez, Spanish late-Baroque architect and painter (born 1719)
Zou Yigui, Chinese painter in Qing Dynasty (born 1686)

 
Years of the 18th century in art
1770s in art